Irune Murua Cuesta (born 23 April 1986) is a Spanish retired football forward who played for Athletic Bilbao of Spain's Primera División.

Career
Murua was a member of the Spanish team that won the 2004 Under-19 European Championship, where she scored two goals in the two first matches against Switzerland and Finland.

In May 2017, she announced her retirement from professional football.

Honours

Club
 Athletic Bilbao
 Primera División (4): 2003–04, 2004–05, 2006–07, 2015–16

International
 Spain
 UEFA Women's Under-19 Championship (1): 2004

Personal life
Irune Murua is the daughter of former footballer Andoni Murua.

References

External links
 
 
 Profile at Athletic Bilbao
 Profile at La Liga 

1986 births
Living people
Spanish women's footballers
Footballers from Barakaldo
Primera División (women) players
Athletic Club Femenino players
Women's association football forwards
Athletic Club Femenino B players
Spain women's youth international footballers